MS Color Hybrid is a cruiseferry owned and operated by Color Line on their route between Sandefjord in Norway and Strömstad in Sweden. The largest plug-in diesel-electric hybrid vessel in the world, she entered service in August 2019.

History
Color Line signed a letter of intent with Norwegian shipbuilder Ulstein Verft for the construction of Color Hybrid in January 2017.  The order was confirmed the following month, and construction began with a steel-cutting ceremony on 14 July at the CRIST shipyard in Gdynia, Poland.  On 16 April 2018, the ship's keel, built from 14 modules, was completed, with work in Poland to complete the hull continuing into October, when it was towed to Ulsteinvik for outfitting.  In early November, Color Hybrid's hull reached the shipbuilding hall in Ulsteinvik, where construction continued until her delivery in mid-2019.

After the delivery to Color Line in 2019, Color Hybrid has replaced  on the route between Sandefjord, Norway and Strömstad, Sweden.  Her hybrid propulsion system allows her to operate under battery power in the coastal areas outside of Sandefjord. The total travel time is 2.5 hours, the batteries would allow up to one hour of electric travel.

Design
When delivered, she will be the largest plug-in hybrid vessel in the world. She is powered primarily by four Bergen Marine B33:45L diesel engines driving, supplemented by 5 MWh Siemens batteries weighing 65t that can power the ship for up to an hour. The battery system is charged via shore power at Sandefjord and from on-board generators driven by the diesel engines.

See also
Largest ferries of Europe

References

External links
 Color Line official website

Ferries of Norway
Cruiseferries
Ships built in Gdynia
Color Line (ferry operator)
Merchant ships of Norway